The Carnegie Building, also known as the Carnegie Steel Building, was a high-rise building in Pittsburgh, Pennsylvania.

History 
The structure started construction in 1893 and was completed in 1895 as the city's tallest at the time. It was the first steel-framed skyscraper in Pittsburgh upon completion. The building served as the world headquarters of Carnegie Steel Company, a steel producing company of the late 19th century created by industrialist and philanthropist Andrew Carnegie to manage steel mills in the city, and later to become U.S. Steel.  The building was a Downtown Pittsburgh landmark and was located at 428-438 Fifth Avenue.  It was torn down in 1952 for an expansion of Kaufmann's flagship store.

Height and design
The Carnegie Building was an early example of Chicago school architecture in Pittsburgh, and was designed by the architectural firm Longfellow, Alden & Harlow. It rose 13 floors in height, and stood as the first steel-framed skyscraper in Pittsburgh and one of the first steel-cage structured buildings in the world.

See also
 List of tallest buildings in Pittsburgh

References

1895 establishments in Pennsylvania
1952 disestablishments in Pennsylvania
Skyscraper office buildings in Pittsburgh
Demolished buildings and structures in Pittsburgh
Commercial buildings completed in 1895
Headquarters in the United States
Chicago school architecture in Pennsylvania
Buildings and structures demolished in 1952